The Central Fire Station in Shreveport, Louisiana, at 801 Crockett St., was built in 1922.  It was listed on the National Register of Historic Places in 1991.  The listing included two contributing buildings.

It is a two-story stuccoed brick building.  It has Beaux Arts styling including "a watertable composed of green glazed bricks surmounted by a cast concrete band and a series of prominent cartouches mounted at the entablature level along the main facade and on the building's corners."

A second contributing resource on the property is a five-story hose tower.

It was designed by architect Clarence W. King and built by contractor W.H. Werner.

It has hosted the Shreveport Regional Arts Council.

See also  
 Shreveport Fire Station No. 8
 Shreveport Fire Station No. 10
 National Register of Historic Places listings in Caddo Parish, Louisiana

References

Fire stations on the National Register of Historic Places in Louisiana
National Register of Historic Places in Caddo Parish, Louisiana
Renaissance Revival architecture in Louisiana
Beaux-Arts architecture in Louisiana
Fire stations completed in 1922
1922 establishments in Louisiana
Buildings and structures in Shreveport, Louisiana